GWR 4073 Class No. 7029 Clun Castle is a 4-6-0 steam locomotive built at Swindon Works in May 1950 to a design by Charles Collett for operation on the Western Region of British Railways. It was named after Clun Castle in Shropshire.

British Railways
Its first shed allocation was Newton Abbot. It had a double chimney and a four-row superheater fitted in October 1959. Its most famous moment came on 9 May 1964 on the Plymouth to Bristol leg of a special train marked Z48, which ran to mark the record set sixty years earlier by City of Truro. Number 4073 managed to reach 96 mph on the descent of Wellington Bank in Somerset. Preserved classmate 4079 Pendennis Castle, which worked the Paddington to Westbury leg of the tour before melting its firebars, has also been preserved. Its last shed allocation was at Gloucester in May 1965. It hauled the last official steam train out of Paddington to Banbury on 11 June 1965. It was officially withdrawn in December that year.

Preservation
Sold for scrap at £2,400 to Patrick Whitehouse in 1966, its ownership then passed to 7029 Clun Castle Ltd. In preservation, it has been based at Tyseley TMD, now Tyseley Locomotive Works.

In 1967, carrying a Great Western livery, it hauled trains to mark closure of the GWR route to Birkenhead, from King's Cross to Newcastle and over the Settle-Carlisle Line. In 1972, it joined in the "Return to Steam" tours. After a major overhaul, it emerged in British Railways livery in 1985.  In 1986, it hauled the last train from the old Birmingham Moor Street station. In the mid 1980s, some of the restoration work was undertaken by a government funded Community Programme scheme, managed by Sandwell Metropolitan Borough Council.

September 1987 saw Clun Castle paired with 6000 Class King George V for a series of South Wales weekend enthusiast specials between Swansea and Carmarthen using the turnaround triangles available at either end.

7029 returned to service in October 2017 at the Tyseley Open Weekend in BR Lined Green with the late crest on its tender, although fitted out with the necessary equipment the engine was not certified for mainline use. Clun Castle made its first moves on the mainline for 31 years in February 2019 when it went out on its light test runs, which included a trip to Stratford upon Avon. Its loaded test run was to follow before working its first mainline train since October 1988.

Preservation Photos

Bibliography

References

External links 

The Great Western Archive - Castle class details, 7000 - 7037
7029 Public Recommissioning at Tyseley in Oct 2017

7029
Railway locomotives introduced in 1950
7029
Standard gauge steam locomotives of Great Britain